The Hamilton and Strathaven Railway was a historic railway in Scotland. It ran from a junction with the Hamilton Branch of the Caledonian Railway to a terminus at Strathaven. The railway was worked from the start by the Caledonian Railway, who absorbed  the railway company in 1864.

History

The railway was planned by William Smith Dixon, an Ironmaster.

Its construction was authorised on 10 August 1857; and it was opened on 9 August 1860, from Hamilton to Quarter, for the carriage of goods. It opened fully on 2 February 1863, between Hamilton and Strathaven, for goods and passengers.

Connections to other lines
 Hamilton Branch of the Caledonian Railway at Haughhead Junction.
 East Kilbride Line of the Caledonian Railway at Hunthill Junction.
 Mid Lanark Lines of the Caledonian Railway at 
 Darvel and Strathaven Railway at

References

Notes

Sources

External links
 RAILSCOT on Hamilton and Strathaven Railway

Pre-grouping British railway companies
Early Scottish railway companies
Railway companies established in 1857
Railway lines opened in 1860
Railway companies disestablished in 1864
Caledonian Railway
1857 establishments in Scotland
Transport in South Lanarkshire